Kayıhan is a town (belde) and municipality in the İhsaniye District, Afyonkarahisar Province, Turkey. Its population is 2,118 (2021). The Kayıhan municipality was created in 1989 by the consolidation of the villages of Tekke, Garen, and Kunduzlu. Kayıhan's current neighborhoods include Pınar, Cumhuriyet, Türbe, and Kunduzlu.

Adjacent to Kayıhan's Hayran Veli Mosque is the tomb of Hayran Veli Sultan, said to be a folk healer from Khorasan. Near Kayıhan are various ruins of the Göynüş Valley (the "Phrygian Valley") such as the Aslantaş ("lion stone").

The name "Kayıhan" is said to come from the Kayı tribe to which Oghuz Khan belonged. The settlement was also formerly known as "Kaya-Viran" (rock ruin), after being destroyed in an earthquake.

The 1940 population of Kayaviran is listed as 656 (318 women, 338 men). The 1945 populatıon of Kayaviran is listed as 640 (322 women, 318 men). The 1960 populatıon of Kayaviran is listed as 850 (445 women, 405 men). The 2011 population of Kayıhan is listed as 2266 (1147 women, 1119 men).  The 2012 population of Kayıhan is listed as 2201.

References

Populated places in Afyonkarahisar Province
Towns in Turkey
İhsaniye District